Robina is a suburb in the City of Gold Coast, Queensland, Australia.

Robina is one of the first master-planned residential communities in Australia.  During its construction it was the largest master-planned community in Australia.

Geography 
The Robina Town Centre shopping centre, Bond University, Robina Stadium and Robina Branch Library are located in Robina.

History 
In 1980, Singaporean real estate developer, Robin Loh, and local property developer, Arthur Earle, purchased  of land in the southern Gold Coast, west of Broadbeach. The acquired land, which had previously been used for grazing, would become the suburb of Robina.

Engaging international urban designers Moshe Safdie and Robert Lamb Hart, Dr Loh formed the Robina Land Corporation, which spearheaded the development of Robina into a residential and commercial hub now home to more than 30,000 people and with a workforce 20,000 strong. Robina is considered one of Australia's most successful planned communities, and is one of the Gold Coast's fastest growing suburbs. In the decade from 2001 to 2011 Robina experienced population growth of 4.8 per cent per annum.

The name Robina was officially gazetted on 11 May 1985. The name is a combination of "Robin" (Loh's given name) and "a" (for Arthur Earle).

Robina State School opened on 29 January 1990.

In the original plan, Kerrydale was to be a separate suburb zoned for a golf course, hotel, accommodation and public space to the south-east of the Robina Town Centre. Kerrydale was officially approved on 20 Ferurary 1989 and can be seen on maps of that period. However, it was legislated in the Local Government (Robina Town Centre Planning Agreement) Bill 1992 that Kerrydale would be amalgamated into Robina. On 19 May 1995 the boundaries of Robina were officially extended to absorb Kerrydale.

Robina State High School opened on 29 January 1996.

The Robina Library opened in 2000 with a major refurbishment in 2013.

At the 2016 census, Robina had a population of 23,106. 59.8% of people were born in Australia. The next most common countries of birth were New Zealand 8.1%, England 6.2%, China 2.7%, South Africa 2.0% and Japan 1.4%. 78.0% of people spoke only English at home. Other languages spoken at home included Mandarin 3.3%, Japanese 1.9%, Cantonese 1.4%, Korean 0.8% and Spanish 0.6%. The most common responses for religion were No Religion 31.6%, Catholic 21.3% and Anglican 15.2%.

Transport

Robina has three main arterial roads connecting the suburb with other parts of the Gold Coast. The Pacific Motorway (M1) connects the suburb with the northern suburbs of the Gold Coast as well as Brisbane City. The M1 also travels south, passing the Gold Coast Airport and travels into New South Wales. Robina Parkway is the second main arterial road in the suburb and runs from the M1 Exit 82 (Robina Parkway/Somerset Drive) interchange north crossing Cheltenham Drive, Markeri St, Boowaggan Road and connects Robina with Nerang-Broadbeach Road.  Bermuda Street connects Robina north to Bundall Road and south to Burleigh with interchanges at Cottesloe Drive and Markeri St.Robina has two main bus stations. One located at Robina railway station and the other one, Robina Town Centre bus station being located at Robina Town Centre. Buses currently operate at regular and high frequency intervals, servicing the suburb of Robina as well as the neighbouring suburbs, extending as far as Tweed Heads and as far north as Southport.

In 2012, Gold Coast City Council released a draft of its 2031 Transport Strategy which outlined future extensions of the Gold Coast Rapid Transit system. Under the strategy Council has proposed a line to run from Robina to Nobby Beach.  In its Transport Strategy Council has also proposed to deliver a rapid bus network by 2014, which would offer services from Robina south to Coolangatta and north to Paradise Point.

In January 2021, Arcadia College relocated from Varsity Lakes to Robina.

Education 
Robina State School is a government primary (Prep-6) school for boys and girls at Killarney Avenue. In 2017, the school had an enrolment of 802 students with 58 teachers (51 full-time equivalent) and 31 non-teaching staff (20 full-time equivalent). It includes a special education program.

Robina State High School is a government secondary (7-12) school for boys and girls at Investigator Drive. In 2017, the school had an enrolment of 1412 students with 115 teachers (107 full-time equivalent) and 48 non-teaching staff (35 full-time equivalent). It includes a special education program.

Arcadia College is a private secondary (7-12) school for boys and girls at 12 Centreline Place. In 2018, the school had an enrolment of 188 students with 20 teachers (19 full-time equivalent) and 9 non-teaching staff (7 full-time equivalent).

Australian Industry Trade College is a private secondary (10-12) school for boys and girls at 281 Scottsdale Drive. In 2017, the school had an enrolment of 332 students with 21 teachers and 26 non-teaching staff (25 full-time equivalent).

Bond University has its main campus at Robina.

Medical services

Robina is also home to one of the two public hospitals on the Gold Coast. The Robina Hospital was originally a private hospital and was purchased by Queensland Health in 2002.  An Emergency Department was built in 2007 and a larger expansion opened in 2011 doubling the size of the hospital to 364 beds, making it the sixth largest in Queensland.  The new development includes clinical teaching facilities for Bond University.

The Robina Health Precinct, which opened in 2012, is located on a nearby site to the Robina Hospital and houses community and sub-acute services. Ongoing development of health services in Robina has seen the creation of a healthcare hub in the suburb, with the Robina Health Precinct, Robina Hospital and additional community health services located at the Campus Alpha building all located within 350 metres of each other.

In November 2016 Healthe Care Australia opened Robina Private Hospital, a $24.6 million purpose-built hospital providing specialist mental health and medical services located on Bayberry Lane adjacent to the public Robina Hospital, adding to the growing Robina Health Precinct. Stage One, a 90-bed, three level hospital with group therapy rooms and consulting suites, delivers private mental health and general medicine services for inpatients, day patients and outpatients. The masterplan for the site outlines future development phases with an additional 54 beds as well as surgical services including operating theatres and imaging.

Sporting facilities

Robina Town Centre is the location for Robina Stadium, which was completed in early 2008. The stadium has a seating capacity of over 27,000, and is rectangular, meeting the requirements of rugby league, football and rugby union. The stadium is home to the Gold Coast Titans NRL team since 2008 and the Queensland Country NRC team since 2014. It was also the home to the now defunct Gold Coast United soccer team from 2009 to 2012.

In 2011, the Australian Rugby Union announced that Australia's leg of the IRB Sevens World Series would move to Robina Stadium for at least the next four years and the tournament was rebranded as the Gold Coast Sevens. The rugby sevens tournament at the 2018 Commonwealth Games will be held at the Robina Stadium.

The stadium is adjacent to Robina railway station, providing access to other Gold Coast areas, and to Brisbane. Robina is also home to a duo of amateur Australian rules football clubs, the Robina Roos and the Bond University Bullsharks. Both clubs share a home ground on Scottsdale Drive and compete in the SEQAFL Division 2 and the SEQAFL Division 4 respectively.

The Robina City Parklands Project is a new 20 hectare park on Stadium Drive in Robina. The first stage of construction, which involved bulk earthworks, is now complete. Construction of the parklands and associated facilities will commence in the second half of 2021.

Amenities 
The Gold Coast Techspace in the Robina Community Centre on San Antonio Drive is a makerspace and education centre focusing on electronics, computer programming, and 3D printing.

The Gold Coast City Council operate a public library at the Robina Community Centre at 196 Robina Town Centre Drive.

References

External links

 
 Robina Branch Library

 
Suburbs of the Gold Coast, Queensland